Gunman's Code is a 1946 American Western film directed by Wallace Fox and starring Kirby Grant, Fuzzy Knight and Jane Adams.

Cast
 Kirby Grant as Jack Douglas 
 Fuzzy Knight as Bosco O'Toole 
 Jane Adams as Laura Burton 
 Danny Morton as Lee Fain 
 Bernard Thomas as Danny Burton 
 Charles Miller as Sam Burton 
 Karl Hackett as Rancher Ben Lewis 
 Frank McCarroll as Henchman Trigger

References

Bibliography
 Blottner, Gene. Universal Sound Westerns, 1929-1946: The Complete Filmography. McFarland & Company, 2003.

External links
 

1946 films
1946 Western (genre) films
American Western (genre) films
American black-and-white films
Films directed by Wallace Fox
Universal Pictures films
1940s English-language films
1940s American films